Sir Busick Harwood (1745? – 10 November 1814) was an English physician who became Professor of Anatomy at Cambridge.

Life
The second son of John Harwood of Newmarket, he was born there about 1745. After apprenticeship to an apothecary, he qualified as a surgeon, and obtained an Indian appointment. In India he received considerable sums for medical attendance on princes, but his health suffered, and he returned to England and entered Christ's College, Cambridge. There he graduated M.B. in 1785, and he went on to receive his M.D. from the University of St Andrews School of Medicine in 1790. having been elected Fellow of the Society of Antiquaries of London in 1783, and Fellow of the Royal Society in 1784.

For his M.B. degree Harwood read a thesis on the transfusion of blood. He gave an account of experiments he had made on transfusion from sheep to dogs which had lost a considerable quantity of blood. An account of these experiments is given in a note in Charles Hutton, George Shaw, and Richard Pearson's Abridgment of the Philosophical Transactions, 1809, i. 185, 186. Harwood was dissatisfied with the reasons for the discontinuance of transfusion in cases of loss of blood in his time. He intended to experiment as to the communication of diseases and of medicines by transfusion, but appears to have published nothing on the subject.

In 1785, on the death of Charles Collignon, Harwood was elected professor of anatomy at Cambridge. In 1800 he was appointed Downing Professor of Medicine, retaining his anatomical chair. In 1806 he was knighted. He died at Downing College, Cambridge on 10 November 1814, and was buried in a vault designed by William Wilkins under what is now the Paddock. He married in 1798 the only daughter of the Rev. Sir John Peschell, bart., of Horsley, but left no children.

Harwood was a popular bon-vivant. He covered his walls with small water-colour portraits, six or eight in a frame, done by Silvester Harding, to whom he asked all his university acquaintances to sit. One who refused was his friend Smithson Tennant. A quarrel arose between Harwood and William Lort Mansel about these portraits. Harwood also sent a challenge to Sir Isaac Pennington, the regius professor of physic, which the latter disdained to notice; but the messenger, an undergraduate, published the affair in the London papers.

Works
Harwood published the first volume of a System of Comparative Anatomy and Physiology, Cambridge 1796, and some synopses of his courses of lectures.

Notes

References

Attribution

1745 births
1814 deaths
18th-century English medical doctors
Fellows of the Royal Society
Fellows of Downing College, Cambridge
Fellows of the Society of Antiquaries of London
19th-century English medical doctors
Professors of Anatomy (Cambridge)
Alumni of the University of St Andrews
Alumni of Christ's College, Cambridge
Downing Professors of Medicine